Bogdan Andreyevich Reikhmen (born 26 May 2002) is a Russian football player. He plays for KAMAZ Naberezhnye Chelny on loan from Torpedo Moscow.

Club career
He made his debut in the Russian Football National League for FC Krasnodar-2 on 10 July 2021 in a game against FC Spartak-2 Moscow.

He made his Russian Premier League debut for FC Krasnodar on 5 December 2021 against PFC Sochi.

On 22 June 2022, Reikhmen signed a contract with FC Torpedo Moscow for three seasons with an option for a fourth. On 13 January 2023, he was loaned to FC KAMAZ Naberezhnye Chelny until the end of the season.

Career statistics

References

External links
 
 
 Profile by Russian Football National League
 

2002 births
People from Yevpatoria
Living people
Russian footballers
Association football midfielders
FC Krasnodar-2 players
FC Krasnodar players
FC Torpedo Moscow players
FC KAMAZ Naberezhnye Chelny players
Russian Second League players
Russian First League players
Russian Premier League players